The legal status of unauthorised actions with psilocybin mushrooms varies worldwide. Psilocybin and psilocin are listed as Schedule I drugs under the United Nations 1971 Convention on Psychotropic Substances. Schedule I drugs are defined as drugs with a high potential for abuse or drugs that have no recognized medical uses. However, psilocybin mushrooms have had numerous medicinal and religious uses in dozens of cultures throughout history and have a significantly lower potential for abuse than other Schedule I drugs.

Psilocybin mushrooms are not regulated by UN treaties.
Many countries, however, have some level of regulation or prohibition of psilocybin mushrooms (for example, the US Psychotropic Substances Act, the UK Misuse of Drugs Act 1971, and the Canadian Controlled Drugs and Substances Act).

In some jurisdictions, Psilocybe spores are legal to sell and possess, because they contain neither psilocybin nor psilocin. In other jurisdictions, they are banned because they are items that are used in drug manufacture. A few jurisdictions (such as the US states of California, Georgia and Idaho) have specifically prohibited the sale and possession of psilocybin mushroom spores. Cultivation of psilocybin mushrooms is considered drug manufacture in most jurisdictions and is often severely penalized, though some countries and one US state (New Mexico) has ruled that growing psilocybin mushrooms does not qualify as "manufacturing" a controlled substance.

History
In the United States, psilocybin (and psilocin) were first subjected to federal regulation by the Drug Abuse Control Amendments of 1965, a product of a bill sponsored by Senator Thomas J. Dodd. The law—passed in July 1965 and effected on February 1, 1966—was an amendment to the federal Food, Drug and Cosmetic Act and was intended to regulate the unlicensed "possession, manufacture, or sale of depressant, stimulant and hallucinogenic drugs". The statutes themselves, however, did not list the "hallucinogenic drugs" that were being regulated. Instead, the term "hallucinogenic drugs" was meant to refer to those substances believed to have a "hallucinogenic effect on the central nervous system".

Despite the seemingly strict provisions of the law, many people were exempt from prosecution. The statutes "permit[ted] ... people to possess such drugs so long as they were for the personal use of the possessor, [for] a member of his household, or for administration to an animal". The federal law that specifically banned psilocybin and psilocin was enacted on October 24, 1968. The substances were said to have "a high potential for abuse", "no currently accepted medical use", and "a lack of accepted safety". On October 27, 1970, both psilocybin and psilocin became classified as Schedule I drugs and were simultaneously labeled "hallucinogens" under a section of the Comprehensive Drug Abuse Prevention and Control Act known as the Controlled Substances Act. Schedule I drugs are illicit drugs that are claimed to have no known therapeutic benefit. Johns Hopkins researchers suggest that if psilocybin clears the current phase III clinical trials, it should be re-categorized to a schedule IV drug such as prescription sleep aids, but with tighter control.

The United Nations Convention on Psychotropic Substances (adopted in 1971) requires its members to prohibit psilocybin, and parties to the treaty are required to restrict use of the drug to medical and scientific research under strictly controlled conditions. However, the mushrooms containing the drug were not specifically included in the convention, due largely to pressure from the Mexican government.

Most national drug laws have been amended to reflect the terms of the convention; examples include the UK Misuse of Drugs Act 1971, the US Psychotropic Substances Act of 1978, Australia Poisons Standard (October 2015), the Canadian Controlled Drugs and Substances Act of 1996, and the Japanese Narcotics and Psychotropics Control Law of 2002. The possession and use of psilocybin is prohibited under almost all circumstances, and often carries severe legal penalties.

Complexities of enforcement
Possession and use of psilocybin mushrooms, including the bluing species of Psilocybe, is therefore prohibited by extension. However, in many national, state, and provincial drug laws, there has been a great deal of ambiguity about the legal status of psilocybin mushrooms, as well as a strong element of selective enforcement in some places. Most US state courts have considered the mushroom a "container" of the illicit drugs, and therefore illegal. A loophole further complicates the legal situation—the spores of psilocybin mushrooms do not contain the drugs, and are legal to possess in many areas. Jurisdictions that have specifically enacted or amended laws to criminalize the possession of psilocybin mushroom spores include Germany (since 1998), and California, Georgia, and Idaho in the United States. As a consequence, there is an active underground economy involved in the sale of spores and cultivation materials, and an internet-based social network to support the illicit activity.

Changes in the 2020s
On 3 November 2020, voters passed a ballot initiative in Oregon that made "magic mushrooms" legal for mental health treatment in supervised settings from 1 February 2021. There currently is a bill pending in the California State Legislature that would legalize the "possession, obtaining, giving away, or transportation of, specified quantities of psilocybin, psilocyn, dimethyltryptamine (DMT), ibogaine, mescaline, lysergic acid diethylamide (LSD), and 3,4-methylenedioxymethamphetamine (MDMA)." The bill has been approved by the California State Senate with 21 votes in favor of the same. The bill is currently in committee in the California State Assembly.

On October 5, 2022, the Canadian province of Alberta announced it would be among the first to regulate and allow the use of Psilocybin, LSD, MDMA, mescaline, ketamine, and DMT for medicinal purposes in drug-assisted psychotherapy. The new regulations come into effect in January 2023. In 2022, Colorado became the second US state to legalize psilocybin mushrooms.

On February 5, 2023 Australia approved psilocybin and MDMA in prescription medications for the treatment of PTSD and treatment resistant depression. This will go into effect starting July 1, 2023.

List by country

See also 
 Psilocybin decriminalization in the United States
 Legal status of psychoactive Amanita mushrooms
 Legal status of ayahuasca by country
 Legal status of ibogaine by country
 Legal status of psychoactive cactus by country
 Legal status of Salvia divinorum

References

Further reading 
 International Legal Status of Psilocybin Mushrooms Ananda Schouten, 2004

Psilocybin
Drug control law
Drug policy by country
Law-related lists
Lists by country